Dirk Heirweg (born 27 September 1955) is a Belgian former racing cyclist. He competed in the individual road race and team time trial events at the 1976 Summer Olympics.

References

External links 

1955 births
Living people
Belgian male cyclists
Olympic cyclists of Belgium
Cyclists at the 1976 Summer Olympics
People from Zele
Cyclists from East Flanders